Nick on CBS (also known as Nickelodeon on CBS) was an American Saturday morning children's programming block featuring programming from Nickelodeon that ran on CBS from September 16, 2000, to September 9, 2006. It initially aired programming from the Nick Jr. block until 2002, when it began airing mainline programming from Nickelodeon; in 2004, it switched back to its previous format.

History
On April 14, 2000, a few months after Viacom (which CBS founded in 1952 as television syndication distributor CBS Television Film Sales, and later spun off in 1971) completed its $37 billion merger with CBS Corporation (the original Westinghouse Electric Corporation), CBS reached an agreement with new corporate cousin Nickelodeon to air programming from its Nick Jr. television block beginning that September.

On September 16, 2000, the new three-hour block, known as Nick Jr. on CBS, premiered, replacing CBS Kidshow, produced by Canada-based animation studio Nelvana, which ended its run the week prior on September 9. For the first two years of the Viacom agreement, the block exclusively aired preschool-oriented programming from Nick Jr., including interstitials from the Nickelodeon block's animated mascot, Face, and other Nick Jr. interstitials. Nick Jr. on CBS did not air commercials aside from some Nick and CBS-related commercials and PSAs until early 2001. On September 22, 2001, the block received a rebrand based on the Nickelodeon block's new branding, adding Oswald and Bob the Builder. Nelvana subsequently moved forward to produce a new Saturday morning cartoon block, the Bookworm Bunch (named for the fact that all of the block's series were adaptations of various children's books) for CBS' non-commercial rival, PBS, which would debut a couple weeks afterward.

On September 14, 2002, the block was rebranded as Nick on CBS, and its programming content expanded to animated Nickelodeon series aimed at children between the ages of 2 to 12, in addition to two returning Nick Jr. series Blue's Clues and Dora the Explorer. The rebranding also introduced a new logo with three circles with different colors (orange for Nick, green for the word "On", and blue for CBS) alongside bumpers and promos animated by Primal Screen.

As with its predecessor Think CBS Kids and CBS Kidshow blocks, all of the programs within the block complied with educational programming (E/I) requirements defined by the Children's Television Act, although the educational content in some of the programs was tenuous in nature. It was partly for this reason why some of Nickelodeon's most popular programs (most notably SpongeBob SquarePants, then the cable channel's most popular series) were mainly not included as part of the CBS block, especially during the more open-formatted Nick on CBS era. However, Rugrats aired briefly in 2003, when it was added as a short-lived regular series within the block. Sometime in early 2004, the block had a relaunch, making additions like live-action shows, such as The Brothers García.

The older-skewing Nickelodeon series were discontinued from the block and the revival of Nick Jr. on CBS premiered on September 18, 2004, refocusing the block back exclusively toward preschool-oriented series. On September 17, 2005, the block added Go, Diego, Go! and began incorporating interstitial hosted segments featuring Piper O'Possum. On December 31, 2005, Viacom formally split under the shared control of National Amusements (owned by Sumner Redstone), with CBS and all related broadcasting, television production and distribution properties as well as some non-production entities becoming part of the standalone company CBS Corporation, while Nickelodeon and its parent subsidiary MTV Networks became part of a new company under the Viacom name.

Less than a month later on January 19, 2006, CBS announced that it would enter into a three-year programming partnership with DIC Entertainment (now WildBrain) to produce a new children's program block for the three-hour Saturday morning timeslot featuring new and older series from its program library, to begin airing in Fall 2006. On September 9, 2006, Nick Jr. on CBS ended its run and was replaced with a new block the following weekend called KOL Secret Slumber Party.

Following the announcement of the second merger between CBS Corporation and Viacom, former CBS Corporation CEO Joseph Ianniello was receptive to the possibility of the return of Nickelodeon children's programming to CBS. However, CBS is currently under contract with Hearst Media Production Group to carry the CBS Dream Team E/I programming block until the end of the 2022–23 television season, meaning any new children's programming block coming to air on CBS until late 2023 at the earliest. Any return of Nickelodeon programming to CBS would also have to comply with the FCC's E/I requirements, so the block would still need to air the mandated 3 hours of content considered educational or informational, if it is used in such regard on the network.

Programming
All of the programs aired within the block featured content compliant with educational programming requirements as mandated by the Children's Television Act. Although the block was intended to air on Saturday mornings, some CBS affiliates deferred certain programs aired within the block to Sunday mornings, or (in the case of affiliates in the Western United States) Saturday afternoons due to breaking news or severe weather coverage, or regional or select national sports broadcasts (especially in the case of college football and basketball tournaments) scheduled in earlier Saturday timeslots as makegoods to comply with the E/I regulations. Some stations also tape delayed the entire block in order to accommodate local weekend morning newscasts, the Saturday edition of The Early Show, or other programs of local interest (such as real estate or lifestyle programs).

Former programming

Programming from Nickelodeon

Acquired programming from Nickelodeon

Short-form programming
Amby & Dexter
I Can Do It!
Just Ask!
Just for Me Stories
LazyTown shorts
Maggie and the Ferocious Beast shorts
Mighty Bug 5
Miss Spider's Bug Facts
Nick Jr. Playful Parent
Nick Jr. Presents
Nick Jr. Show and Tell
Nick Jr. Sings
Nickelodeon Election Connection
What's the Buzz with Philomena Fly

References

Television programming blocks in the United States
CBS
CBS original programming
2000 American television series debuts
2006 American television series endings